William Frederick Clingman (November 21, 1869 – May 14, 1958) was a Major League Baseball infielder from -. He played for the Cincinnati Reds, Cincinnati Kelly's Killers, Pittsburgh Pirates, Louisville Colonels, Chicago Orphans, Cleveland Naps, and Washington Senators.

External links

1869 births
1958 deaths
Major League Baseball infielders
Baseball players from Ohio
Cleveland Naps players
Cincinnati Kelly's Killers players
Louisville Colonels players
Pittsburgh Pirates players
Cincinnati Reds players
Chicago Orphans players
Washington Senators (1901–1960) players
19th-century baseball players
Burials at Cave Hill Cemetery
Terre Haute Hottentots players
Memphis Giants players
Indianapolis Hoosiers (minor league) players
Memphis Fever Germs players
Milwaukee Brewers (minor league) managers
Milwaukee Brewers (minor league) players
Kansas City Blues (baseball) players
Columbus Senators players
St. Paul Saints (AA) players
Toledo Mud Hens managers
Toledo Mud Hens players